Murexiella is a genus of sea snails, marine gastropod mollusks in the family Muricidae, the murex snails or rock snails.

This name has become a synonym of Favartia (Murexiella) Clench & Perez Farfante, 1945

Species
Species within the genus Murexiella include:
 Murexiella puntagordana (Weisbord, 1962) 
The other species have been brought into synonymy  
 Murexiella andamanensis Houart & Surya Rao, 1996 : synonym of  Favartia (Murexiella) andamanensis (Houart & Surya Rao, 1996)
 Murexiella angermeyerae (Emerson & D'Attilio, 1965): synonym of Maxwellia angermeyerae (Emerson & D'Attilio, 1965)
 Murexiella asteriae Nicolay, 1972 : synonym of  Favartia (Murexiella) bojadorensis (Locard, 1897)
 Murexiella bojadorensis (Locard, 1897): synonym of  Favartia (Murexiella) bojadorensis (Locard, 1897)
 Murexiella edwardpauli Petuch, 1990 : synonym of  Favartia (Murexiella) edwardpauli (Petuch, 1990)
 Murexiella gemma (Sowerby, 1879): synonym of Maxwellia gemma (Sowerby, 1879)
 Murexiella glypta (M. Smith, 1938): synonym of Favartia (Favartia) glypta (M. Smith, 1938)
 Murexiella hidalgoi (Crosse, 1869): synonym of Favartia (Murexiella) hidalgoi(Crosse, 1869)
 Murexiella hilli Petuch, 1987 : synonym of  Favartia (Murexiella) hilli (Petuch, 1987)
 Murexiella iemanja Petuch, 1979 : synonym of  Favartia (Favartia) glypta (M. Smith, 1938)
 Murexiella kalafuti Petuch, 1987 : synonym of Favartia (Favartia) kalafuti (Petuch, 1987)
 Murexiella keenae Vokes, 1970 : synonym of  Favartia (Murexiella) keenae (Vokes, 1970)
 Murexiella laurae Vokes, 1970 : synonym of  Favartia (Murexiella) laurae (Vokes, 1970)
 Murexiella leonardhilli Petuch, 1987 : synonym of  Favartia (Murexiella) macgintyi (M. Smith, 1938)
 Murexiella levicula (Dall, 1889): synonym of Favartia (Favartia) levicula (Dall, 1889)
 Murexiella macgintyi (M. Smith, 1938): synonym of  Favartia (Murexiella) macgintyi (M. Smith, 1938)
 Murexiella mactanensis Emerson & D'Attilio, 1979 : synonym of  Favartia (Favartia) mactanensis (Emerson & D'Attilio, 1979)
 Murexiella martini Shikama, 1977 : synonym of  Favartia (Favartia) martini (Shikama, 1977)
 Murexiella mildredae Poorman, 1980 : synonym of  Murexsul mildredae (Poorman, 1980)
 Murexiella peregrina Olivera, 1980 : synonym of  Favartia (Favartia) peregrina (Olivera, 1980)
 Murexiella radwini Emerson & D'Attilio, 1970 : synonym of  Favartia (Murexiella) radwini (Emerson & D'Attilio, 1970)
 Murexiella santarosana (Dall, 1905): synonym of Maxwellia santarosana (Dall, 1905)
 Murexiella taylorae Petuch, 1987: synonym of Favartia (Murexiella) taylorae (Petuch, 1987)
 Murexiella venustula Poorman, 1983 : synonym of  Favartia (Favartia) exigua (Broderip, 1833)

References

Muricopsinae